The St. John Paul II Church, is the name given to a Roman Catholic church building, located in Keilisvegi 775, in the town of Keflavik, Sudurnes (South Peninsula) in Iceland.

The congregation follows the Roman or Latin rite and is under the jurisdiction of the Catholic Diocese of Reykjavík (Dioecesis Reykiavikensis). As its name indicates, it was dedicated to the memory of John Paul II, which was declared a saint on April 27, 2014, by the Pope Francis.

Due to the composition of the parish congregation, Masses are offered in Icelandic and Polish.

See also
Roman Catholicism in Iceland
St. John Paul II

References

Roman Catholic churches in Iceland
Buildings and structures in Keflavík
Polish diaspora in Europe